Until One is the debut compilation album by Swedish house music supergroup Swedish House Mafia. It was released on 22 October 2010.

Critical reception

On its release, Until One received generally mixed reviews from most music critics. At Metacritic, which assigns a normalised rating out of 100 to reviews from mainstream critics, the album received an average score of 54, based on 6 reviews, which indicates "mixed or average reviews".

Singles
 "One" was the first single to be released from the album and was released in the UK on 6 September 2010, debuting at number 7. The single version, "One (Your Name)", featured vocals from Pharrell Williams.
 "Miami 2 Ibiza" was the second single to be released from the album and featured vocals from Tinie Tempah. First released on 1 October 2010, the single peaked at number 4 on the UK Singles Chart.

Track listing

Charts

Certifications

Release history

References

2010 compilation albums
Swedish House Mafia compilation albums
European Border Breakers Award-winning albums